Syngamus is a genus of nematodes belonging to the family Syngamidae.

The genus has almost cosmopolitan distribution.

Species:

Syngamus anterogonimus 
Syngamus gibbocephalus 
Syngamus merulae 
Syngamus microspiculum 
Syngamus palustris 
Syngamus taiga 
Syngamus trachea 
Syngamus trachealis

References

Rhabditida
Rhabditida genera